Force is a 2011 Indian Hindi-language action thriller film directed by Nishikant Kamat. The film stars John Abraham, Genelia D'Souza and the debutant Vidyut Jammwal. It is a remake of Gautham Vasudev Menon's successful 2003 Tamil film, Kaakha Kaakha, the plot follows a dutiful cop who chases the capture of a dreaded gangster. The film released on 30 September 2011, and received mostly positive reviews upon release. John Abraham's performance was praised by public and critics. Its sequel Force 2 has been released in 2016, making it the first installment of the Force film series.

Plot
Assistant Commissioner of Police Officer Yash / Yashvardhan Singh (John Abraham) is a responsible and stone-hearted  cop in the NCB. He has no family or loved ones and has been alone in life since he can remember. Everything changes when Yash meets Maya (Genelia Deshmukh), an independent woman. Though the two get off to a rocky start, Maya warms up to him once she realises he is a cop, and apologises for the misunderstandings they had. When Maya suffers from an accident in front of Yash, he rushes her to the hospital. With that, the two bond and start to meet regularly. Maya confesses her love to Yash, but Yash refuses, telling her that she does not want her to become his weakness in his professional life. However, Swati, the wife of Yash's co-worker and good friend DSP Atul Kalsekar (Mohnish Bahl), convinces Yash that he is in love with Maya as well, and Yash decides to accept her love.

In the big drug case where the unit is investigating, Yash, along with DSP Mahesh Pandey, who is transferred on special duty from the New Delhi Income Tax Department and Inspector Kamlesh Sawant (Kamlesh Sawant), kills a drug baron named Reddy (Mukesh Rishi). Yash, Mahesh, Kamlesh and Atul are suspended for killing Reddy instead of arresting him. Reddy's heartless and aggressive brother Vishnu (Vidyut Jammwal) vows to avenge Reddy's death by killing all the officers. Yash and the other officers prepare themselves for Vishnu, but Vishnu and his henchmen successfully break into Mahesh's home and brutally murder him and his wife Rachana after raping her. The event shakens Yash and the other officers, but Yash and Maya's marriage takes place. Meanwhile, Vishnu decides to attack each of the officers's weaknesses, where he kidnaps Swati and Atul is forced to tell him where Yash will be that night. 

Yash and Maya spend time with each other. However,  Vishnu attacks them and Yash is shot to death, but miraculously surives, while Maya is kidnapped. Vishnu tells Atul that he will release Swati if Atul kills Yash. However, Atul cannot bring himself to kill his friend and instead joins forces with Yash to execute a plan against Vishnu and save Swati and Maya. They learn that Vishnu has been keeping Maya and Swati hostage and find, in horror, that Swati has been murdered. Heartbroken, Atul kills himself, while Yash and Kamlesh arrive together and face Vishnu in a final confrontation. Kamlesh is shot, but survives. Vishnu shoots Maya thrice in front of Yash and drops her and she dies in Yash's arms, but not before letting Yash know that her dream of closing her eyes and dying in Yash's arms has come true. Enraged, Yash brutally finishes off Vishnu, exacting his vengeance. At the end, Yash is living alone again, having returned to his professional life, while remembering his moments with Maya.

Cast

 John Abraham as Assistant Commissioner Of Police Officer Yashwardhan ″Yash″ Singh ', Maya's husband
 Vidyut Jammwal as Vishnu Reddy, Vijay's brother                      
 Genelia D'Souza as Maya Yashwardhan Singh, Yash's wife
 Raj Babbar as Mahesh Singh Rajput IRS; Zonal director of NCB, Mumbai, Yash's boss
 Mohnish Bahl as Atul Kalsekar, Swati's husband and Yash's teammate
 Mukesh Rishi as Vijay 'Anna' Reddy, Vishnu's brother
 Kamlesh Sawant as Inspector Kamlesh Sawant, Yash's teammate
 Sandhya Mridul as Swati Kalsekar, Atul's wife
 Anaitha Nair as Rachana, Mahesh's girlfriend
 Saksham Dayma as Bala, Vishnu's right-hand man
 Ninad Kamat as Vasu, Vishnu's right-hand man
 Ameet M. Gaur as Mahesh, Yash's teammate
 Shashank Shende as Arvind
 Parineeta Borthakur as Maya's sister

Production

Development
In July 2004, Gautham Vasudev Menon agreed terms to direct a version of Kaakha Kaakha in Hindi with Sunny Deol in the lead role and revealed that the script was written five years ago with Deol in mind, but the film eventually failed to take off. Producer Vipul Shah approached him to direct the Hindi version of the film in 2010 as Force with John Abraham and Katrina Kaif, and Menon initially agreed before pulling out again. He cited that he felt the eight years gap between the releases of it with the original was too long; subsequently Nishikant Kamat of Evano Oruvan and Mumbai Meri Jaan fame was roped in by the producers to direct the remake. Initially, Asin was signed up to reprise her role that she played in the Telugu remake of the film – Gharshana, but as the film became delayed, dates clashed with her other film, Ready, hence she was forced to withdraw from the film. She was consequently replaced by Genelia D'Souza. The villain was chosen as Vidyut Jamwal, a model turned actor who had reportedly won the role from 500 other people who were originally considered. He had to undergo strenuous training to build a body that could be comparable to the hero of the film.

Filming
The shooting of the film ended in February 2011, after sixty five days of the shoot. During the filming, John Abraham stated that "With Nishikant I have discovered the magic of raw action, but what is even more beautiful is the romance in 'Force'. This I believe will be my first pan India film after a long gap." The film involved tough stunts which Allan Amin, who worked with John Abraham earlier in Dhoom, had choreographed.

Controversy

Controversy broke out about the film, in a scene where John and Genelia were being married. Sources claim that the ceremony conducted was so authentic that had they completed the last round they would have actually been man and wife. Again, following the reports of Ritesh Deshmukh and Genelia's marriage plans, the priest insisted that the couple could not marry as Genelia is already married to John.

Soundtrack

The soundtrack is composed by Harris Jayaraj, which is his second album in Hindi after his successful album Rehnaa Hai Terre Dil Mein (2001). "Khwabon Khwabon" was reused from the song "Uyirin Uyire" in the original film Kaakha Kaakha, and "Main Chali" was reused from the song "Manasa" in Munna and “Mudhal Mazhai” from Bheemaa, half of each, and all the reused songs were composed by Harris Jayaraj; the lyrics were penned by Javed Akhtar. The track "Dum Hai Toh Aaja" was composed by Lalit Pandit. Sameer Phaterpekar composed the film's Background Score. The soundtrack album featuring five tracks was released by T-Series on 24 August 2011.

Track listing

Reception 
Joginder Tuteja of Bollywood Hungama gave 3 out of 5 stars and said, "Force delivers as promised and turns out to be an impressive soundtrack. While 'Khwabon Khwabon' was anyway expected to be the USP of the soundtrack, 'Main Chali' turns out to be another number that works quite well for the soundtrack. Overall, an album that has a potential to turn much bigger if the film too turns out to be a good success." Tanuj Manchanda of Planet Bollywood gave 7 out of 10 and quoted in his review that "After hearing all songs, one can say that this is undoubtedly one of the best albums of the year both in terms of lyrics and compositions. Harris Jayaraj has proved his mettle time and again and this time also he succeeds with flying colours. Javed akhtar as usual is dedicated towards giving his best. And the best part of the album is that all songs except 'Dum Hai To Aaja' are soulful and a treat for all music lovers and does not have any remixes to rob off the impact. Force is definitely recommended!" Devesh Sharma at Filmfare awarded it 3 out of 5 stars and quoted "Overall, Jayraj has arrived on the Hindi music scene and one looks forward to hearing more of his original tunes (and not reprises) in future." Komal Nahta of Koimoi.com stated that, "the songs have not become as popular as they are nice. Javed Akhtar's lyrics are appropriate."

Release
The film released on 30 September 2011. The film is John Abraham's biggest opening for a release up-to date.

Critical response
DNA India rated the movie by giving 4 out of 5 stars stating that "Force is high voltage action". The Times of India gave Force 3 and half stars out of 5, asking all Gods of War enthusiasts to go for the film. On the contrary, The Deccan Chronicle gave 2 and half stars out of 5 and wrote, " Force doesn’t live up to its title…at all". Hamara Bollywood gave the film 3 out of 5 stars saying "in the category of action movies, Force just might be the best one of the year". Komal Nahta of Koimoi.com also rated 2.5 out of 5 stars. Komal Nahta further stated that "On the whole, Force will be liked by the youngsters, especially guys. In the final tally, it will prove to be an above-average fare, thanks to the impressive start all over". Mayank Shekhar of Hindustan Times gave 2 stars out of 5 concluding that, "Force is hardly a force to reckon with".

Box office
Upon release, the film opened to decent start at the domestic box office and packed cinema halls, "witnessing 100% occupancy across shows", according to Boxofficeindia.com. The film grossed  in India on the first day. Force has fared well, despite number of screens and shows being limited. It collected approx Rs 245.2 millionnett in Week 1. Breakdown:- Fri 50.5 million Sat 47.5 million Sun 62.0 million Mon 24.2 million Tue 21.5 million Wed 21.0 million Thu 18.5 million Force is John's biggest opener, in solo lead. The film dropped on Monday but then held steady collections through the weekdays but the collections were low. Force fell heavily in its second weekend taking an 85% fall from its first, it collected 20 million nett which took its ten-day business to 235.0 million nett. Moreover, Force had a poor opening of around $500,000 in Overseas. The opening figures from United Kingdom were £65,000, North America $100,000, UAE $160,000 and Australia $60,000. The movie collected 347.2 million in India and was declared "Above Average" by Boxofficeindia.com.

Sequel
Producer Vipul Shah planned a sequel to this film. The film titled Force 2  started shooting close to September 2015 and was released in November 2016 . The film was directed by Abhinay Deo.

Sonakshi Sinha played a RAW agent in the sequel. Sonakshi announced this news on Twitter on Saturday, 11 July 2015.
"Yep yep! Told you I had news for you... Super excited to be playing a RAW agent in my next film – FORCE 2," she posted.

References

External links
 
 

2011 action thriller films
2010s Hindi-language films
Hindi remakes of Tamil films
2011 films
Indian action thriller films
Films about the illegal drug trade
Fictional portrayals of the Maharashtra Police
Films scored by Harris Jayaraj
Fox Star Studios films
Films with screenplays by Ritesh Shah
Films directed by Nishikant Kamat
Films about the Narcotics Control Bureau